Nationality words link to articles with information on the nation's poetry or literature (for instance, Irish or France).

Events
 April 14 - Death of English poet William Whitehead in London. Reverend Thomas Warton succeeds him as Poet Laureate of Great Britain after the refusal of William Mason.
 May 22 - Scottish poet Robert Burns' first child, Elizabeth ("Dear-bought Bess"), is born to his mother's servant, Elizabeth Paton.

Works published in English

United Kingdom
 Samuel Egerton Brydges, Sonnets and other Poems, published anonymously
 Robert Burns, "To A Mouse", "Halloween"
 William Combe, The Royal Dream; or, The P[rince] in a Panic, published anonymously
 William Cowper, The Task, Volume 2 of Poems, in addition to the title poem, the book includes "The Diverting History of John Gilpin" (a poem first published in 1782), "An Epistle to Joseph Hill, Esq.", "Tirocinium; or, A Review of Schools" (first volume of Poems published 1782, Poems 1815)
 George Crabbe, The News-Paper
 William Hayley, A Philosophical, Historical and Moral Essay on Old Maids
 Samuel Johnson, The Works of Samuel Johnson, poetry and prose in 11 volumes (another two volumes published in 1787 and another in 1788)
 Hannah More, Sensibility: A Poetical Epistle, United Kingdom
 Edward Lovibond, Poems on Several Occasions
 Charles Wilkins (translator), Bhagvat-geeta, or Dialogues of Kreeshna and Arjoon
 John Wolcot, writing under the pen name "Peter Pindar":
 The Lousiad, Canto 1 (Canto 2 published 1787, Canto 3 in 1791, Canto 4 in 1792, Canto 5 in 1795)
 Lyric Odes, for the Year 1785
 Ann Yearsley, Poems, on Several Occasions

Works published in other languages
 János Bacsanyi, The Valour of the Magyars, Hungary
 Jens Baggesen, Comic Tales, written in imitation of Voltaire; Denmark
 Friedrich Schiller, Ode to Joy, Germany

Births
Death years link to the corresponding "[year] in poetry" article:
 January 13 - Samuel Woodworth (died 1842), American author, literary journalist, playwright, librettist and poet
 March 7 - Alessandro Manzoni (died 1873), Italian poet and novelist
 April 4 - Bettina von Arnim (died 1859), German writer, poet, composer and novelist
 April 6 - John Pierpont (died 1866), American poet, teacher, lawyer, merchant and Congregational minister
 October 18 - Thomas Love Peacock (died 1866), English satirical novelist and writer
 November 13 - Lady Caroline Lamb, born the Honourable Caroline Ponsonby (died 1828), English aristocrat, novelist and poet best known for her affair with Lord Byron
 Also:
 Bhojo Bhagat (died 1850), Indian, Gujarati-language devotional poet
 Gopala Krishna Pattanayak (died 1862), Indian, Oriya-language poet

Deaths
Birth years link to the corresponding "[year] in poetry" article:
 January 19 - Zaharije Orfelin (born 1726), Serbian educator, administrator, poet, engraver, lexicographer, herbalist, historian, winemaker, translator, editor, publisher, polemicist and traveler
 April 14 - William Whitehead (born 1715), English poet and playwright
 April 26 - Karl Siegmund von Seckendorff (born 1744), German
 April 27 - Henry Taylor (born 1711), Church of England clergyman, author and poet
 September 17 - Antoine Léonard Thomas (born 1732), French poet
 November 25 - Richard Glover (born 1712), English poet
 December 29 - Johan Herman Wessel (born 1742), Norwegian poet

See also

Poetry

Notes

18th-century poetry
Poetry